In additive combinatorics, the sumset (also called the Minkowski sum) of two subsets  and  of an abelian group  (written additively) is defined to be the set of all sums of an element from  with an element from . That is,

where there are  summands.

Many of the questions and results of additive combinatorics and additive number theory can be phrased in terms of sumsets. For example, Lagrange's four-square theorem can be written succinctly in the form

where  is the set of square numbers. A subject that has received a fair amount of study is that of sets with small doubling, where the size of the set  is small (compared to the size of ); see for example Freiman's theorem.

See also
Restricted sumset
Sidon set
Sum-free set
Schnirelmann density
Shapley–Folkman lemma
X + Y sorting

References

 
 
Terence Tao and Van Vu, Additive Combinatorics, Cambridge University Press 2006.

External links